Mute Beat was an influential dub reggae band from Japan.

They are often considered a precursor to acid jazz, ambient and trip hop having performed similar-sounding music before those genres emerged. The band was formed by Kazufumi Kodama, who grew up enjoying marching band music and later discovered reggae in the late 70s. In 1981 he formed Mute Beat with the aim to make dub music that would go boldly into unexplored music territories, including the use of marching band techniques. The original keyboardist Gota Yashiki left the band in the mid 80s and moved overseas to produce music for Soul II Soul and Sinéad O'Connor amongst others. Mute Beat's first release was a self-titled cassette on New York's Roir label. They collaborated with many musicians including Jagatara, Gladstone Anderson, Roland Alphonso, King Tubby, and Lee Scratch Perry.

Members 
 Kazufumi "Echo" Kodama - trumpet
 Akihito Masui - trombone
 Hiroyuki Asamoto - keyboards
 Gota Yashiki - keyboards (previously)
 Takayoshi Matsunaga - bass
 Hideyuki Imai - drums
 Izumi "Dub Master X" Miyazaki - dub mix

Discography

Albums 
 Japanese Dub (Cass) (1986)
 In Dub (Cass) (1986)
 Still Echo (LP) (1986) (Wackies)
 Lovers Rock (Cass) (1987)
 Live (CD) (1989)
 In Dub (CD) (1996)
 No. 0 Virgin Dub (LP) (1996)

Singles 
 (1984) Mute Beat
 (1988) Sunny Side Walk

References 

Japanese reggae musical groups
Dub musical groups